Ostružnica railway station is a railway station of Belgrade railway junction. Located in Ostružnica, Belgrade, Serbia. Railroad continued to Surčin in one, in the other direction to Belgrade marshalling yard "A", in third direction to Belgrade marshalling yard "B", in fourth direction to Jajinci and the fifth direction towards to Resnik. Ostružnica railway station railway station consists of 4 railway tracks.

See also 
 Serbian Railways

References 

Railway stations in Belgrade
Čukarica